Gangcheng Road is a Shanghai Metro interchange station in Pudong, Shanghai, located at the intersection of Gangcheng Road and North Zhangyang Road. It is served by Lines 6 and 10. On Line 6, it is the northern terminus of the line. It began operations on 29 December 2007, with the opening of Line 6. It became an interchange station with the opening of the second phase of Line 10. The extension was expected to open in 2018, however, due to construction delays, it finally opened on 26 December 2020.

The station is located near the Waigaoqiao section of the Shanghai Free-Trade Zone (formerly the Shanghai Waigaoqiao Free Trade Zone). However, the adjacent station to the east on Line 10, Jilong Road station, is located within the zone.

Station layout 

As part of phase two of Line 10, the northern side platform of Line 6 has been converted to an island platform and extended to fit the longer trains on Line 10. An additional side platform was built further to the north. Since the opening of Line 10, this station features a cross-platform interchange between arriving passengers on Line 6 and  station-bound passengers on Line 10. It is the only elevated cross-platform interchange on the entire Shanghai Metro network.

References

Railway stations in Shanghai
Line 6, Shanghai Metro
Line 10, Shanghai Metro
Railway stations in China opened in 2007
Shanghai Metro stations in Pudong